CelebAir is a reality TV series in which 11 celebrities perform the duties of cabin crew and check-in attendants. The series was presented by Angellica Bell and aired on ITV2 from 2 September 2008 until 23 October 2008, when Lisa Maffia was declared the winner.

For the show, Monarch Airlines repainted one of its Airbus A321 aircraft, registration G-OZBI, with the CelebAir logo along with a new tail fin design. The aircraft was used for the majority of CelebAir flights although the celebrities additionally worked on normal Monarch branded aircraft.

CelebAir activity took place on Monarch flights which were already part of the summer schedule; with the rear of the aircraft allocated as the CelebAir cabin with the celebrities working from the rear galley along with their mentors.

Before any of the celebrities were allowed to start their new jobs, they undertook a six-week training programme run by Monarch and were required to adhere to Monarch's standards whilst working for CelebAir.

The series is set in London Gatwick Airport and, in the finale, the private jet took off and landed at London Stansted Airport. There are seven destinations that CelebAir flew to; those being Tenerife South Airport, Faro Airport, Málaga Airport, Ibiza Airport, Mahon Airport, Larnaca International Airport and Alicante Airport.

Celebrities

Mentors
Ross Archer
Lauren Newton
Brian Martin
Sara Turner

Information
Beckwith was pregnant whilst filming was taking place. Due to her pregnancy she was unable to work on the flights.
Lisa and Jonny were sacked in a double elimination due to the two of them abandoning their cabin crew duties to party for two hours at Eden in Ibiza instead of crewing the return flight to London Gatwick.

Cancellation
ITV announced in late 2008 that the show had been cancelled after only one series due to poor ratings.

Television ratings

"—" denotes where information currently unavailable

References

External links

Monarch Airlines – CelebAir website
 Details of the Embraer Legacy private jet used in the final

2000s British reality television series
2008 British television series debuts
2008 British television series endings
Aviation television series
ITV reality television shows
Television series by ITV Studios
Television series by Zeppotron
English-language television shows
Flight attendants